The Ministry of Sports is a cabinet-level federal ministry in Brazil. It was established in 1995 as the "Special Ministry of Sports"; in 1998, this became the "Ministry of Sports and Tourism". In 2003, the Ministry of Tourism was separated from its portfolio. The cabinet was extinct by Jair Bolsonaro in 2019, folded into the Ministry of Citizenship,  but Luiz Inácio Lula da Silva announced he would restore it in 2023, with Ana Moser as the new minister.

The Ministry directed the National Institute of Sport Development.

Ministers

See also 
 Other ministries of Sport

References

External links
 Official site 

Government ministries of Brazil
Sports governing bodies in Brazil
1995 establishments in Brazil